The 7.5 cm GebG 36() was a  German mountain gun used during World War II. At least 1,193 were built between 1938 and 1945. It was the standard light gun of the German mountain divisions, both Army and Waffen-SS, during World War II.

Development and description

The 7.5 cm GebG 36 was designed by Rheinmetall to meet an Army requirement for a 7.5 cm howitzer to serve in the mountain divisions (Gebirgs Divisionen) and replace the World War I-era mountain guns still in service such as the Austro-Hungarian 7.5 cm Gebirgskanone 15. Production began in 1938 although exactly how many were produced that year is unknown. Some 1,193 were built between 1939 and 1945.

The design of the 7.5 cm GebG 36 was relatively conventional in regard to the gun itself, with its standard German horizontal sliding breech block and muzzle brake. To maximize its ability to fire at high-angles, it was given rear trunnions to lengthen the distance between the breech and the ground, although springs became necessary to balance the muzzle preponderance. Furthermore, it used the a variable recoil system that shortened the recoil as the elevation increased. The breech was uncommonly massive as it incorporated a transport joint to allow it to be separated from the barrel.
The spades at the end of the split trail legs were removable. Generally it used light-alloy disc wheels with rubber rims, but early guns had wooden-spoked wheels. No shield was fitted to save weight. It could be towed in one load or broken down into eight pack-loads to be carried by mule or horse.

Because of its lightness the 7.5 cm GebG 36 would jump when fired at low angles as the recoil forces would force the gun's trail spades to act as a fulcrum and lever the wheels upwards. In fact Charge 5, the largest propellant increment, was forbidden to be fired at angles under 15° because the gun would jump excessively. Firing at higher angles was perfectly safe as the ground absorbed any residual recoil forces not absorbed by the recoil system.

Ammunition

The 7.5 cm GebG 36 fired a wide variety of ammunition, with the notable exception of a conventional armor-piercing shell. When the situation demanded, it could fire a colored smoke shell. It used four increments of propellant which were added together to reach the desired range. A fifth charge could be used which replaced all the other charges for targets at the limit of the gun's range. While this range was respectable for a light gun, the 7.5 cm calibre soon proved too small for the demands of World War II.

Organization
The guns were organized into batteries of four guns each with two or three batteries per battalion. A mountain artillery regiment (Gebirgs-Artillerie Regiment) would have anywhere from one to three battalions equipped with the 7.5 cm GebG 36.

Notes

References
 Chant, Chris. Artillery of World War II, 
 Engelmann, Joachim and Scheibert, Horst. Deutsche Artillerie 1934-1945: Eine Dokumentation in Text, Skizzen und Bildern: Ausrüstung, Gliederung, Ausbildung, Führung, Einsatz. Limburg/Lahn, Germany: C. A. Starke, 1974
 Gander, Terry and Chamberlain, Peter. Weapons of the Third Reich: An Encyclopedic Survey of All Small Arms, Artillery and Special Weapons of the German Land Forces 1939-1945. New York: Doubleday, 1979 
 Hogg, Ian V. German Artillery of World War Two. 2nd corrected edition. Mechanicsville, PA: Stackpole Books, 1997

External links

 the 7.5 cm GebG 36 at Lexikon der Wehrmacht

75 mm artillery
World War II mountain artillery
World War II artillery of Germany
Military equipment introduced in the 1930s